Ettiam Calderón Lastres (born October 24, 1984) is a Paralympic T46/47/F46/47 track and field athlete from Cuba. He competed in sprint and long jump events at the 2008, 2012 and 2016 Olympics and won a bronze medal in the 200 m sprint in 2008, finishing fourth in the long jump. Calderón has no left arm below the elbow.

References

Living people
1984 births
Paralympic athletes of Cuba
Cuban male sprinters
Cuban male long jumpers
Athletes (track and field) at the 2008 Summer Paralympics
Athletes (track and field) at the 2012 Summer Paralympics
Athletes (track and field) at the 2016 Summer Paralympics
Paralympic bronze medalists for Cuba
Medalists at the 2008 Summer Paralympics
Paralympic medalists in athletics (track and field)
Medalists at the 2007 Parapan American Games
Medalists at the 2011 Parapan American Games
Medalists at the 2015 Parapan American Games